INS Himgiri (F34) was a  of the Indian Navy. Himgiri was commissioned into the Navy on 23 November 1974. She was decommissioned on 6 May 2005.

A new ship with this name belonging to the new Nilgiri class was launched in December 2020.

Operations
INS Himgiri holds the record for the number of days at sea in a single deployment for a conventional ship of the Indian Navy. In 1976, she was the first ship of the Indian Navy to shoot down a pilotless aircraft.

References

1970 ships
Nilgiri-class frigates
Frigates of the Indian Navy